Events in the year 1804 in India.

Events
 National income - 11,422 million
The Nizam of Hyderabad acquires Berar from the Marathas.
Delhi becomes a British possession though the King of Delhi remains in the city till 1857.

Law

References

 
India
Years of the 19th century in India